Pierre Joseph de Vassivière (23 April 1879, in Bordeaux – after 1933) was a 20th-century French poet and playwright

A lawyer at the Court of Appeal of Paris, he is best known for having received the Prix Caroline Jouffroy-Renault of the Académie Française in 1934 for A fleur d’aile.

Works 
18992: Tout par l'égoïsme
1917: D'Estanzit, ou l'Éminence jaune, one-act comedy, with Gustave Guiches
1917: Le Budget de l'amour, one-act comedy, with Raphaël Adam
1917: Une Larme de poète, play in verse in 1 act, with Guillaume Livet
1917: Le Revenant, drama in 3 acts
1918: L'Âme française. Ode à la France
1923: La Berceuse de l'Angelus, poetry
1923: A fleur d’aile, collection of poems, foreword by Jean Richepin
1925: Dans l'ombre, one-act play
1828: Anthologie de l'Anti-Chapelle Poétique. Des vers, 100 poèmes à dire ou à mettre en musique
1931: La Jeune fille doit-elle rester vierge ?
1933: Vague du désir

Notes 

20th-century French dramatists and playwrights
20th-century French poets
1879 births
Writers from Bordeaux
Year of death missing